Hell is a village in the Lånke area of the municipality of Stjørdal in Trøndelag county, Norway.

Hell is a post town with two post codes: 7517 for delivery route addresses and 7570 for post-office boxes. Hell currently has a grocery store, gas station, a fast food shop, and a retirement home. Until late 1995, the European route E6 highway was aligned through Hell and across the Hell bridge to Sandfærhus (nearby is the Trondheim Airport, Værnes).  The new road now goes around the village.

Name

The village of Hell has become a minor tourist attraction because of its name, as visitors often have their photograph taken in front of the station sign. A smaller building on the railway station has been given the sign , which is the archaic spelling of the word for "goods handling" ( would be the spelling in the contemporary Norwegian language).

The name Hell stems from the Old Norse word hellir, which means "overhang" or "cliff cave". It has a more common homonym in modern Norwegian that means "luck". The Old Norse word Hel is the same as today's English Hell, and as a proper noun, Hel was the ruler of Hel.

Among English-speaking tourists, popular postcards depict the station with a heavy frost on the ground, making a visual joke about "Hell frozen over". Temperatures in Hell can reach  during winter.

British punk band The Boys recorded their third album in the village, and as a result named it To Hell with the Boys.

Climate
Trondheim Airport Værnes is used as the official meteorological office for this region. Temperatures in both the winter and summer are moderate due to the geography of the location: the average January highs are still above freezing despite a high latitude. Hell has a humid continental climate that is close to being subarctic and also close to being oceanic.

Amenities
Hell railway station is situated at a railway junction where the Nordland Line north to Bodø branches off from the Meråkerbanen between Trondheim and Storlien, Sweden. Hell Station is currently a staffed railway station.

The Hell Kjøpesenter mall is located at Sandfærhus north of the Stjørdalselva river, rather than in Hell/Lånke, and thus the name is a misnomer.

A blues festival takes place every year at Hell Station in September,  The original festival (Hell Blues Festival) started in 1992, then changed its name to Hell Music Festival in 2006 to open their doors for music other than blues. The Hell Music Festival in 2007 failed to attract many concert-goers, however, and the festival declared bankruptcy the same year. In 2008 a new festival was started, entitled "Blues in Hell", going back to the original concept.

Since 2011, the circuit in the village has hosted a round of the FIA European Rallycross Championship (and from 2014 the FIA World Rallycross Championship).

Notable people
Mona Grudt, Miss Norway 1990 and Miss Universe 1990, is from a small town near Hell. During the 1990 Miss Universe competition, she listed herself as "The beauty queen from Hell" as a publicity stunt.

See also
List of places with unusual names

References

External links

 

Villages in Trøndelag
Stjørdal
Tourist attractions in Trøndelag